is a Japanese mystery novel series written by Nisio Isin and illustrated by Vofan. It has been published by Kodansha since October 2014 under their Kodansha Bungei label. A manga adaptation by Yō Asami titled  was serialized in Kodansha's Monthly Shōnen Magazine from August 2015 to March 2017. It was collected in five tankōbon volumes. A Japanese drama adaptation also titled Okitegami Kyōko no Bibōroku aired for 10 episodes on NTV from October to December 2015.

Synopsis

Setting
Kyōko Okitegami is a detective with a unique trait; her memory resets each time she falls asleep. Despite this challenge, she is able to solve cases brought to her by clients in nearly a day. The story is divided into two distinct sections. The first section is a longer story in which a young man named Yakusuke Kakushidate, who has been falsely accused, plays the role of the sidekick. In the second section, a short story, Kyōko Okitegami plays the role of the sidekick.

Characters

Played by: Yui Aragaki
Kyōko Okitegami is the protagonist of the story and the head of the Okitegami Detective Agency. Her exact date of birth is unknown, but she proclaims herself to be 25 years old. Kyōko is known as the "fastest detective" due to her ability to solve highly confidential cases within a day, and she is also referred to as the "forgetful detective" due to her anterograde amnesia. She loses her memory the moment she falls asleep, which makes her suitable for such cases. To compensate for her memory loss, Kyōko writes information about herself and the case on her arms, legs, and stomach with a magic pen. She is willing to stay up all night for as many days as necessary to solve the case. Kyōko has a keen sense of money, including gratuities.
Kyōko resides and works in a three-story building, which serves as both her office and her home. The building has various security checks, and it takes an hour to get to the entrance of the parlor. She typically wears modest clothing, but on occasions, she wears revealing clothes that show a lot of skin. She has a reputation for never wearing the same outfit twice.
It is rumored that Kyōko lost her memory after a certain point in her life, which she keeps as a trade secret. Before that time, she remembers some things, such as the books she was reading, but she does not remember who she was. She also remembers some of her physical experiences after she became this way.
In Kyōko's bedroom, there is bold and rough handwriting in black paint on the ceiling, which is not her own, saying: "From today on, you are Kyōko Okitegami. You will live as a detective." This is the first thing she sees when she wakes up in the morning. As she continues to work as a detective according to this text, she is looking for the person who wrote it.
Kyōko appears in Mazemonogatari, a crossover novel with the Monogatari series. She also appears in the fifth volume of the Pretty Boy series, Panoramato Bidan, in the section White-Hair Beauty. In this volume, she gives Mayumi false theories about an art-theft case that happened at a certain museum.

Played by: Masaki Okada
The narrator is a character who appears in some of the novels beginning with the first volume. He is 25 years old and has a height of over 190cm. Yakusuke is often falsely accused and has been involved in many cases since childhood. Despite his timid nature, he is unable to do anything wrong or tell lies. To clear his name, he seeks help from various detectives, including Kyōko Okitegami. Yakusuke has difficulty finding a stable job and frequently moves from one location to another.
He harbors romantic feelings for Kyōko, and is always taken aback when she greets him with "Nice to meet you" every time he seeks her assistance.

Production
Nisio expressed his interest in writing mystery stories during the time he was working on Koyomimonogatari. He noted that many of his recent works at the time had become more elaborate in terms of rhetoric and dialogue, and therefore he wrote this series with less emphasis on those areas. Nisio also mentioned that Okitegami Kyōko no Bibōroku has similarities with his debut novel, Kubikiri Cycle: The Blue Savant and the Nonsense User, as the protagonist Kyōko could have easily fit into the setting of his first novel, and he viewed it as a return to his roots.

The character design for the series, Vofan, stated that Nisio had a broad audience in mind for the series, so he designed the characters to focus more on fashion and have a warmer, more inviting feel, as opposed to Monogatari, which he considered to have a more male-oriented audience.

Nisio revealed in the afterword of Okitegami Kyōko no Kansatsu-hyō that he has planned a total of 24 volumes for the series.

Media

Novels

Manga

Reception
Okitegami Kyōko no Bibōroku won the Special Award in the 2014 Award of Book☆Walker for being the author's first e-book and for its exceptional sales despite being a single publication. Additionally, it ranked seventh in the site's 2014 e-book rankings and in the Literature category.

The following year, the novel received the 2015 Award of Excellence in Literature at the Book☆Walker Award of 2015. It also ranked 51st overall in the site's 2015 e-book rankings and third in the Literary Arts category.

In 2016, the novel ranked ninth in the Single Books and Novels category at the This Light Novel is Amazing! 2017 awards.

References

2015 Japanese television series debuts
2015 Japanese television series endings
2014 Japanese novels
Anime and manga based on novels
Japanese mystery novels
Kodansha books
Kodansha manga
Mystery anime and manga
Nisio Isin
Shōnen manga
Works by Akiko Nogi